Mary Frances Creighton (July 29, 1899 – July 16, 1936), was a housewife, who along with Everett Applegate, a 36-year-old former American Legion official, was executed in Sing Sing Prison's electric chair, Old Sparky, for the poisoning of Applegate's wife, Ada, in Baldwin, New York on September 27, 1935. She had passed out before the execution, and was executed in an unconscious state.

While living in Newark, New Jersey, Creighton was also suspected of poisoning her mother in-law, Anna Creighton, in 1920, her father in-law, Walter Creighton, in 1921, and her younger brother, Raymond Avery, in 1923. Creighton and her husband, John, were tried for Raymond's death in 1923, but were acquitted due to a lack of witnesses. The Anna Creighton murder trial, which was held in 1923 as well, also ended with Creighton being acquitted, again due to a lack of witnesses, and also due to the testimony of toxicologist Alexander Gettler, who found only a trace amount of arsenic in Anna Creighton's system.

Creighton claimed to have poisoned Ada Applegate so that her fifteen-year-old daughter, Ruth, who she had been pimping out to Everett Applegate, could legally marry Everett. After Creighton's arrest for the murder of Ada Applegate, she repeatedly confessed to and denied killing both mother in-law, Anna, and her younger brother, Raymond.

References

1899 births
1935 murders in the United States
1936 deaths
20th-century executions by New York (state)
20th-century executions of American people
20th-century American women
American people executed for murder
American female murderers
Executed American women
Housewives
People executed by New York (state) by electric chair
People from Newark, New Jersey
People from Rahway, New Jersey
Poisoners
Suspected serial killers